Innokenty Andreyevich Khalepsky (14 July 1893 – 29 July 1938) was a Soviet general, formerly also the People's Commissar for Communications of the USSR. He was a recipient of the Order of Lenin and the Order of the Red Banner. As head of the Department of Mechanization and Motorization, he informed tank designer Semyon Alexandrovich Ginzburg of Poland's acquisition of light infantry and cavalry tanks from the British and French on 26 January 1931. He was one of the 10 individuals promoted to Komandarm 2nd rank on 11 November 1935. During the Great Purge, he was denounced by Dmitry Shmidt, who had taken into custody by the NKVD. While serving as People's Comissar, others who had been denounced by Shmidt including Marshal Mikhail Tukhachevsky, Ieronim Uborevich and Iona Yakir were executed. He was removed from his post, arrested and later executed himself.

Bibliography
 Bolshaya Sovietskaya Encyclopedia t. 28 Moscow 1978.
 http://www.sakharov-center.ru/asfcd/martirolog/?t=page&id=14861 (ros.)

1893 births
1938 deaths
Soviet komandarms of the second rank
Great Purge victims from Russia
People executed by the Soviet Union
Recipients of the Order of Lenin
Recipients of the Order of the Red Banner